Prachi Thakker  is an Indian television actress known for her roles on Hindi television. She started her acting career with Balaji Telefilms serial Kasautii Zindagii Kay on the Star Plus channel, Tu Kahe Agar by Edit II Productions on Zee TV, Havan by Edit II Productions on Colors TV, Neeli Chatri Waale by Garima Productions on Zee TV,

Prachi is currently doing a show called Sethji by Offshore Productions on Zee TV, in which she is playing the main antagonist. The character is called Devi, and is a challenging role as it has shades of comedy. Devi is an attractive woman who wants to rule the village by becoming the next sethji as well as avenge her husband’s humiliation who has been expelled from the village. But she does it with great smoothness justifying the injustice that has happened with her.

Personal life
Thakker was married to actor Pankit Thakker since 2000. They're living living separately since 2015, to file for divorce. She has a son with him.

Television

Awards

Nominations

 ITA Award 2002 - Best Actress in Supporting Role as Rakhhi Sen Gupta for Kasautii Zindagii Kay
 Indian Telly Award 2002 - Best Actress in Supporting Role as Rakhhi Sen Gupta for Kasautii Zindagii Kay
 ITA Award 2003 - Best Actress in Supporting Role as Rakhhi Sen Gupta for Kasautii Zindagii Kay

References 

http://www.bombaytimes.com/tv/prachi-sheds-her-simple-girl-image-to-go-glam/articleshow/57018856.cms
http://www.tellychakkar.com/tv/tv-news/prachi-thakker-never-seen-avatar-zee-tv-s-next-161104
https://mail.google.com/mail/u/0/?ui=2&ik=cf281764fa&view=att&th=1595f0c5f2398cd4&attid=0.1&disp=safe&zw
http://www.zoomtv.com/telly-talk/fresh/article/i-believe-in-starting-my-year-with-my-3-pillars-of-strength-says-prachi-thakker/21170
http://epaper.prabhatkhabar.com/1156424/RANCHI-City/City#page/28/1
http://epaper.prabhatkhabar.com/1148887/RANCHI-City/City#page/28/1
http://epaper.prabhatkhabar.com/1140839/KOLKATA-City/kolkata-city#page/14/1
http://epaper.prabhatkhabar.com/1047873/RANCHI-City/City#page/26/1
By : www.facebook.com/sanjeetnmishra

Indian television actresses
Living people
Year of birth missing (living people)